The suprarenal plexus is formed by branches from the celiac plexus, from the celiac ganglion, and from the phrenic and greater splanchnic nerves, a ganglion being formed at the point of junction with the latter nerve.

The plexus supplies the suprarenal gland, being distributed chiefly to its medullary portion; its branches are remarkable for their large size in comparison with that of the organ they supply.

References

External links

Nerve plexus
Nerves of the torso
Adrenal gland